"Chuffy" is the fourth episode of the second series of the 1990s British comedy television series Jeeves and Wooster. It is also called "Jeeves in the Country".

In the US, the episode was aired as the second episode of the fourth series of Jeeves and Wooster. It aired on 15 January 1995 on Masterpiece Theatre. The episode "Aunt Dahlia, Cornelia and Madeline" was aired as the fourth episode of the second series instead.

Background 
Adapted from Thank You, Jeeves.

Cast
 Jeeves – Stephen Fry
 Bertie Wooster – Hugh Laurie
 "Chuffy", Lord Chuffnell – Matthew Solon 
 Pauline Stoker – Sharon Holm
 J. Washburn Stoker – Manning Redwood
 Brinkley – Fred Evans
 Myrtle Pongleton – Fidelis Morgan
 Seabury Pongleton – Edward Holmes
 Sgt. Voules – Dave Atkins
 Dobson – William Waghorn

Plot
Bertie's insistence on playing the trombone drives Jeeves to give notice. Bertie hires a less satisfactory valet, Brinkley. Bertie's friend, Lord Chuffnell or "Chuffy", quickly snaps Jeeves up.

Bertie rents a country cottage from Chuffy in Chuffy's family-owned village of Chufnell Regis in Devon, and practices his trombone. Chuffy is intent on selling Chuffnell Hall to J. Washburn Stoker, so that he can afford to marry Stoker's daughter Pauline. He discovers, to his concern, that Pauline was once engaged to Bertie—and that Washburn wants Bertie to stay away from his daughter.

Jeeves produces a plan to get Pauline and Chuffy together that results in the burning down of Bertie's cottage.  Sympathetic to Bertie, however, Jeeves resumes working for him at the end of the episode.

The seaside part of the Chufnell Regis village scenes (beach, jetty, steep hillside cottages) were filmed in Clovelly, Devon. The thatched cottage village scenes were filmed elsewhere. Chuffnell Hall scenes were filmed at Wrotham Park in Hertfordshire.

See also
 List of Jeeves and Wooster characters

References

External links
 

Jeeves and Wooster episodes
1991 British television episodes